David Mitchell (born April 23, 1982) is an American retired ice dancer. He competed for most of his career with partner Loren Galler-Rabinowitz. Together they are the 2004 U.S. bronze medalists.

Career 
Mitchell began skating at the age of eight and took up ice dancing at ten. He teamed up with Galler-Rabinowitz before the 1999 season, finishing fifth on the novice level at their first-time competition at the United States Figure Skating Championships. They went on to win the novice title in 2000 and the junior title in 2002. That, combined with their pewter medal in 2003 at the senior level, made them the first US figure skaters to medal at the Novice, Junior, and Senior levels at Nationals in a four-year span. The pair finished fourth in the 2003 World Junior Figure Skating Championships.

Galler-Rabinowitz and Mitchell won bronze at the 2004 U.S. Championships. They missed the following year's national championship due to surgery to repair torn cartilage in Mitchell's shoulder. Their bronze medal finish was noteworthy in that both teams who placed above them were at the time ineligible for the Olympics. Had the Olympics been held that year, Mitchell and Galler-Rabinowitz would have been the highest ranking US ice dancers sent.

The pair made news in late 2005 when Mitchell's mother campaigned against a bill that would make ice dancers Tanith Belbin and Maxim Zavozin U.S. citizens in time for the 2006 Winter Olympics. Despite her letter urging Senator Hillary Clinton to vote against it, the bill passed. The effort was moot, however: Galler-Rabinowitz and Mitchell only finished ninth at the 2006 U.S. Championships, which would not have scored the duo an Olympic berth even if the Belbin and Zavozin teams had been ineligible.

Mitchell retired after the 2005/2006 competitive season.

Personal life 
Mitchell graduated from Tufts University in 2004 where he studied Political Science & Government and was a brother at Delta Tau Delta. He is currently attending Law School at the University of Florida.

Competitive highlights
(with Galler-Rabinowitz)

Programs 
(with Galler-Rabinowitz)

References

External links

"2002 US National Junior Dance Champions," 5/03
 "Loren Galler-Rabinowitz and David Mitchell; Dancers Excel in Multiple Endeavors," 4/1/04

1982 births
American male ice dancers
Living people
University of Florida alumni
Sportspeople from Ann Arbor, Michigan